Konstantinos Spanoudis (1871 – 24 April 1941) was a Greek politician of the Liberal Party, journalist and the first president of AEK sports club.

Biography
Spanoudis was born in 1871 in Fanari, Constantinople. A graduate of the Phanar Greek Orthodox College, he studied Political science in Paris. After completing his studies he returned to Istanbul and devoted himself to journalism. In 1904 he started publishing the newspaper "Progress", the patriotic character of which cost him persecution and two expulsions.

He joined the Greek Liberal Party and became close associate of Prime Minister Eleftherios Venizelos during the military operations of Greece in the Balkan Wars and World War I.

After the Asia Minor Catastrophe he settled in Athens. In 1924 he and other Constantinopolitans founded Athletic Union of Constantinople (A.E.K.) and Spanoudis became the first President of the new club. In 1932 he was elected MP with the Liberal Party and at the same time left the administration of AEK to join politics, keeping only a formal position.

He died on 24 April 1941 in Athens.

Personal life
In 1910, Spanoudis married a distinguished music critic, Sofia Ioannidis. Together they had one daughter, Athina (1921–1998), who was a radio producer for 35 years at ERT. In October 2008, the Municipality of Athens honored Spanoudis, giving his name to the square located next to the metro station at Kato Patisia.

References

1871 births
1941 deaths
Constantinopolitan Greeks
Liberal Party (Greece) politicians
Greek journalists
Greek football chairmen and investors
Turkish people of Greek descent
AEK (sports club)
AEK Athens F.C.
AEK Athens F.C. chairmen
Greek MPs 1932–1933
People from Fatih
Politicians from Istanbul
Journalists from Istanbul